Shayaz is a mountain in the Hindu Kush mountain range of Asia. Located in Khyber Pakhtunkhwa, Pakistan, it has a summit elevation of 6,026 m above sea level.

See also
 List of mountains in Pakistan
 List of Ultras of the Western Himalayas

References

Mountains of Khyber Pakhtunkhwa
Six-thousanders of the Hindu Kush